The Bombardier Global 7500 and Global 8000 are ultra long-range business jets developed by Bombardier Aviation (formerly Bombardier Aerospace).

Announced in October 2010, the program was delayed by two years by a wing redesign. The 7500, originally named the 7000, made its first flight on November 4, 2016, was type certified by Transport Canada on September 28, 2018, and entered service on 20 December 2018. 

Based on the Global 6000 with a new transonic wing, and a cabin with 4 areas or "zones".

The Global 8000 was initially a shorter three-zone aircraft, but was updated in May 2022 as a longer-range 7500, reaching 8,000 nmi (14,800 km) and to be introduced in 2025.

Development
Announced in October 2010, the jets were initially scheduled for introduction in 2016 for the 7500 and 2017 for the 8000.
In 2015, Bombardier decided to redesign the aircraft's wing and, along other development challenges, delayed the programme by over two years. The goal of the redesign was to reduce the wing's weight without altering its aerodynamic profile. The aircraft fly-by-wire system architecture is based on that of the CSeries. The airframe will use Aluminium–lithium alloys like the other airliner.
The program cost more than US$1 billion.

Global 7500

Formerly named Global 7000, its entry into service was initially scheduled for 2016. Former Formula One driver and long time Bombardier brand ambassador Niki Lauda announced his order ahead of the EBACE 2015 convention.

The first test aircraft underwent taxi testing in October 2016. Dedicated to testing basic system functionality and assessing the handling and flying qualities of the aircraft, its maiden flight was performed on November 4, 2016, climbing to 20,000 feet (6,096 m) and reaching 240 knots during the 2 h 27 min flight.

The production wing was in final design in February 2017. FTV2 flew on March 6, 2017, "The Powerhouse" is designed to test aircraft systems, including propulsion, electrical and mechanical systems. FTV1 is used to open the performance envelope and reached Mach 0.995 on March 29, 2017. FTV3 flew on May 10, 2017, "The Navigator" will be used to test the avionics and electrical system performance.

By the end of May 2017, the three prototypes flew a combined 250 hours.

The fourth prototype, used for cabin interior validation, is called "The Architect" and the fifth and final, for the entry-into-service, is called "The Masterpiece". The fifth has a slightly lighter production wing supplied by the Triumph Group, after a dispute over the wing weight was resolved.

By mid-July 2017, the three flight-test aircraft had accumulated 500 hours. On 15 August 2017, after "high vibration and high inter-turbine temperature readings", the second prototype's right GE Passport had an in-flight flameout at FL410 and the aircraft went back to Wichita Airport 156 nmi (290 km) away for a single engine landing.

By October 2017, the four flight-test aircraft had flown 900 hours.

As the original Global Express is developed into the Global 5500 and 6500, it is renamed Global 7500 to reflect this range increase.

By the end of May 2018, the five flight-test aircraft had amassed about 2,000 hours towards the type's planned entry-into-service at year-end. By June 2018, 2,300 flight test hours had been completed by the test fleet towards certification. The first production aircraft entered the completion centre in May 2018.

Flight testing was completed by August 2018 after over 2,400 hours; type certification and introduction into service are expected by year-end, with 15-20 customer deliveries in 2019, as 20 aircraft were in final assembly. By September 2018, the test aircraft had flown over 2,700 hours as FTV1 was retired from testing and repainted to be used as a demonstrator.
Bombardier was expecting certification in September 2018.

Transport Canada awarded its type certification on September 28, 2018. FAA type certification followed on November 7, 2018.
The first was expected to be delivered in December, then 15 to 20 in 2019, and 35 to 40 in 2020, with the program sold out through 2021.
After being delivered in early December, the Global 7500 entered service on 20 December with 100 secured orders.

In February 2019, Bombardier acquired the Global 7500 wing manufacturing program and facilities from Triumph Group.
In 2021, its equipped price was $75M.

Global 8000
Entry into service was initially scheduled for 2017. By September 2016, it was delayed to early 2019. Lacking differentiation, it might be replaced by a higher maximum take-off weight (MTOW) Global 7500 variant with more range. The 8000 unit cost was $71 million in 2014.

Instead of the initially planned 2.6m (8.5ft) shrink of the Global 7000, Bombardier launched the Global 8000 as a longer range variant of the 7500 at the May 2022 EBACE.
As service entry is planned for 2025, the earlier model will be phased out for the new 8000, while existing 7500s can be converted through a service bulletin.
Bombardier was already flight testing its modified FTV5 testbed, which reached a slightly supersonic Mach 1.015 in May 2021; the certification campaign is expected to be completed using a single prototype.
With low development costs, it will compete with the new Gulfstream G800, and its list price rises from $75 million to $78 million.

Design

Both are stretched derivatives of the Global 6000 with a new transonic wing. They are powered by the new General Electric Passport 20  thrust engine with reduced NOx emissions and 8% better fuel efficiency than the Global Express XRS, allowing a Mach 0.90 high-speed cruise. As part of its effort to make the long-range aircraft comfortable for the passengers, Bombardier developed a new ergonomic passenger seat, called the Nuage. The seat design took seven years to complete.
Airbus-owned Stelia supplies the main fuselage.

The new, larger and lower-drag wing is optimized for Mach 0.85 with a 35.3° quarter chord wing sweep, a thinner thickness-to-chord ratio, leaner flap track fairings, improved lift-to-drag performance, more efficient winglets and up to 30% better low-speed lift due to double-slotted, inboard Fowler flaps.
The new fly-by-wire flight controls with active load alleviation and the flexible, relatively highly loaded wing damps turbulence.

The metal airframe uses aluminium–lithium alloys to save weight.
Additionally the  cabin windows are 80% larger, the nose cowl is recontoured, and the aft fuselage and empennage are both new designs.
The basic inspection intervals are 850 hours or 36 months, with C checks are every 12 years or 8,500 cycles and a limit of 17,000 cycles before life extension through intensive maintenance is required.

Global 7500

Officially designated as the BD-700-2A12, the design is marketed as the Global 7500. It is planned to have a four-zone 2,637 cu ft (74.67 m3) cabin, 20% more than the previous. It was originally designed to cover a  range at Mach 0.85 with 10 passengers.

Its cabin is one-third longer than competing models, providing a fourth seating section up from three, can sleep eight passengers and offers an optional shower and a sleeping crew rest area.
Bombardier marketing focused on ultra-high-net-worth individuals and the Global 7500 is the largest, longest range, roomiest and most luxurious purpose-built business aircraft yet built.

Despite the wing area being smaller than the Gulfstream G650ER and a 11% higher MTOW, it has lower V speeds and better runway performance due to the high-lift system with leading-edge slats and double-slotted flaps for a similar power loading.
An even longer range variant could reach  more with another  of fuel.

Global 8000

It was to feature a three-zone 2,236 cu.ft. (63.32 cu.m.) cabin and a range of 7,900 nmi (14,631 km) at Mach 0.85, farther than any other existing business jet.

The Global 7500-derived 8000 can fly 8,000 nmi (14,800 km) and reach a maximum speed of Mach 0.94.
The engine control software will be updated and more fuel can be carried through better space and weight utilization.

Operational history 

Gulfstream announced in April 2019 that the G650ER had surpassed this record flying , i.e. 225 nmi (417 km) farther over a timespan 44 minutes shorter. On 6 October 2019 Bombardier improved their longest mission with an  non-stop flight between Sydney and Detroit, claiming the record for "the longest city-pair flown by a purpose-built business aircraft". The Global 7500 also broke the business jet speed record for a flight from Van Nuys Airport near Los Angeles to Teterboro Airport near New York in under four hours, cruising at Mach 0.925 for much of the flight.

Orders 
While Bombardier is not publishing a specific backlog, industry analyst Rolland Vincent estimated that 200 orders had accumulated by the time of the first flight in November 2016, mostly for the 7500 version. Including the Global 5500/6500, Bombardier expects to deliver 90–100 Globals a year by 2021, up from 40 in 2018, with four 7500 a month, and higher if needed. Luxury charter VistaJet signed a deal to purchase up to 30 units; NetJets, the largest fractional jet provider, will take up to 20 Global 7500s and Hong Kong management firm HK Bellawings Jet has 18 Global 6500/7500s orders and options. The Global 7500 had 100 secured orders as it entered service on 20 December 2018. In October 2019, VistaJet said it plans to launch commercial flights on its first Global 7500 in January 2020.  Bombardier considered 2020 a successful year for the Global 7500 as they delivered 35 aircraft to various customers, and on 29 March 2021, the company marked the milestone delivery of the 50th Global 7500.

In November 2022 NetJets was named as the launch customer for the Global 8000. The company paid US$312M in a firm order for four Global 8000s and also converted existing orders for eight Global 7500s to 8000s. NetJets plans to convert its current fleet of Global 7500s to a 24 aircraft fleet of Global 8000s.

Specifications

See also

References

External links
 
 
 

Global 7500
Twinjets
T-tail aircraft
Aircraft first flown in 2016